Banco de la Producción (BANPRO) is a bank in the city of Managua, Nicaragua.

History
BANPRO was founded as a private bank in 1991 in Managua, Nicaragua. During the Nicaraguan banking crisis (2000-2002), BANPRO assumed the performing loans in Banco Intercontinental's (INTERBANK) portfolio, while the Central Bank took over control of the nonperforming loans.

References

External links
 Official Website

Companies based in Managua
Banks of Nicaragua